Estadio Roberto Jordán Cuéllar is a multi-use stadium in Cobija, Bolivia. It is currently used mostly for football matches, on club level by local sides Mariscal Sucre, Universitario de Pando and Vaca Díez. The stadium has a capacity of 24,000 spectators.

References

External links
Soccerway team profile

Football venues in Bolivia
Buildings and structures in Pando Department